KYTY is a Christian radio station based in San Antonio, Texas and broadcast on 810 AM.  810 AM is a United States clear-channel frequency.

History
Signed on May 16, 1988 as "Good News Radio, 810 KCHG", airing a Christian format. In July 1998, the station was leased through a local marketing agreement with Clear Channel Radio to make room for the format of 96 KSJL.  From July through Labor Day, KCHG was simulcast with 96.1 KSJL-FM.

When the simulcast began, KSJL played more of an adult oriented rhythm and blues. Once KSJL moved to 810 AM and 92.5 FM KSJL-FM, the station's hip-hop lean and the Mix Show was no more, instead playing mostly slow jams and softer music. Crossover hits like Zhane "Groove Thang", or Montell Jordan's "This is how we do it" were no longer in the music rotation. Between 1998-2000, KTFM was the only commercial FM outlet for hip-hop, until the arrival of KBBT 98.5 the Beat.

KSJL History

The KSJL calls originated on 760 AM.  Its formats on 760 AM included "Spirit of 76" and The "Z-rock" SMN Network. While at 760, it was also part of a simulcast with sister station KSAQ 96.1 as "Super Q, Q96.1".

When KISS 99.5 returned as a rock station, 76 Z-rock called it quits, as a market with three separate rock stations could not generate revenue at that time.

In 1992 76-KSJL "The Touch" was born, and was the first urban adult contemporary station serving the African American community of San Antonio.  It was billed as "Your Station" (as in "The People's Station"), and was owned by Inner City Broadcasting Corporation; by sheer coincidence, ICBC founder Percy Sutton was a native of San Antonio. In March 1993 the calls moved to 96.1 FM.  Inner City Broadcasting sold KSJL-AM to Clear Channel Broadcasting to make room for WOAI-760 as a news and talk format.  In 1994 to 1995 WOAI became a talk radio format "Talk Radio 760 KTKR" and then became the ticket this was due to satisfy FCC regulations which dictate radio stations owned by the same company can not have the same format on multiple stations unless it is a simulcast.

KSJL 96.1 FM continued until 1998 when it was sold to Clear Channel.  KSJL-FM was moved, to make way for KXXM, to lower power rimshot 92.5 FM with a simulcast on 810 AM.  KSJL aired some sports event broadcasts that did not fit on the schedules of sister stations WOAI and KTKR.

In 2004 the AM and FM were split and 92.5 FM became hip hop and R&B formatted KHTY, while 810 AM continued the adult urban format.

KSJL 810 AM ceased broadcasting March 1, 2007, and became "Star 810AM" when the LMA that Clear Channel Communications operated it under with Maranatha Broadcasting ended and Maranatha flipped it to Christian Contemporary.  New calls for 810 AM were subsequently established as KYTY.

KSJL's former audience, mostly African Americans, were upset by the format change as this was the only outlet for news and entertainment information in their community.

High school football
During the 2007 high school football season, live audio can be heard on KYTY from nearby Commalander Stadium if there is a NEISD high school home game at Comalander Stadium.

External links

YTY